The 2000-01 season, was the Belfast Giants first season of Ice Hockey. They competed in the Sekonda Superleague and played home games at the Odyssey Arena in Belfast, Northern Ireland.

The Giants first took to the ice in the league in a game with the Nottingham Panthers, which they lost, 5-1, on 16 September 2000. Kory Karlander scored the Giants' first Superleague goal. The following evening the club secured its first-ever league win when they defeated the Bracknell Bees 6-5 in a penalty shoot-out. Not only did it turn out to be their only shoot-out success of the season but it was also their only win in Bracknell. The club would play the first 15 games of the season on the road before they finally had their opening home game on Saturday 2 December 2000 in front of a sell-out Odyssey Arena. The evening ended in a 2-1 victory for the visiting Ayr Scottish Eagles.

President Bill Clinton was the reason for Belfast's home game against Newcastle Jesters on 13 December 2000 being cancelled. It was postponed to accommodate the President who used the new Odyssey Arena, the largest public building in Belfast, to address the local citizenry.

Schedule and results

Regular season

Player Awards 
 Player Of The Year - Shane Johnson
 Player's Player Of The Year - Kory Karlander
 Coach's Player Of The Year - Todd Kelman
 Fans' Player Of The Year - Shane Johnson
 Harp Lager Award (goal scorer) - Rod Stevens

References

External links 
 Official Belfast Giants website

 
Bel